The Chinese eastern coastal province of Jiangsu has an expansive network of national and provincial-level expressways.

Numbering 
Expressways in Jiangsu province (and the rest of China) are designated with a letter prefix, which represents whether it is a provincial or national-level expressway, followed by a two-to-four character alphanumeric designation. The letter prefix G, which stands for Guodao, literally meaning national road, is used for national expressways, and the letter prefix S, which stands for Shengdao, literally meaning provincial road, is used for provincial expressways. National expressways are numbered according to the National Trunk Highway System numbering rules. In Jiangsu, the provincial-level expressways are assigned numbers as follows:
 North-south expressways are given odd numbers less than 70.
 East-west expressways are given even numbers less than 70.
 Branch and port expressways are given numbers larger than 70. Currently the highest designation is 96.

List of routes 
There are 36 provincial expressways currently completed, under construction, or in the planning stages as part of the provincial expressway plan. These include 13 north-south expressways, 9 east-west expressways, and 14 branch lines, given numbers greater than 70. In addition, there are 14 national-level expressways that are entirely in or will pass through the province. In 2013, some of the provincial-level expressways have also been upgraded as national expressways and given national-level expressway numbers.

National-level expressways

Provincial-level expressways

References 

Transport in Jiangsu